"" (Now, brothers, we are cheerful) is a German Catholic hymn. It was written by Georg Thurmair as both a pilgrimage song and a Marian hymn. The melody was composed by Adolf Lohmann, who wrote a choral setting in 1936. Related to youth pilgrimages to an image of Mary at the Altenberger Dom, it is also known as "" (Altenberg pilgrimage song).

In the process of adapting the text to gender-neutral language, the first line has been changed, replacing "brothers" by "we all", "friends" or "Christians". Several regional sections of the Catholic hymnal Gotteslob offer alternatives. It is "" in the Diocese of Hamburg, GL 902, "" in the Diocese of Münster of 1996, GL 875, and "" in the Diocese of Limburg, GL 878.

History 
Haus Altenberg next to the Altenberger Dom was founded in 1922 as a meeting place for Catholic youth by Carl Mosterts. His successor  made it in 1926 the centre of the Catholic Jugendbewegung in Germany. From 1935, the movement was restricted to strictly religious meetings by the Nazi government, leading to an increase in events such as pilgrimages. The 1530 sculpture of Mary in the centre of the Altenberger Dom became the destination of processions, including , processions with candles and torches at night.

Several new songs were written, including works by the secretary of the youth movement, Georg Thurmair, set to music by Adolf Lohmann. One of them was the 1935 song "". Thousands of young people met for the processions until 1938.

The song became known as the "" (Altenberg pilgrimage song).

Publication and reception 
The hymn was first published in 1935 in the youth magazine  for which Thurmair was an editor. Thurmair included the song also in a 1938 poetry collections,  (The first poems to the friends), which was banned by the Nazis shortly after publication.

Adolf Lohmann wrote a five-part choral setting, which was published in 1936 as ""
In the first common Catholic hymnal, the 1975 Gotteslob, it was not part of the common section, but in 16 regional sections. In the 2013 edition, it was again not included in the common section, but in several regional sections, however avoiding the term "" in the first line as not neutral to gender.

References

External links 
 Nun, Brüder, sind wir frohgemut jubilate-verlag.com, p. 2
 Regensburger Domspatzen / The Finest Songs Of Mary AllMusic
 Orgelimprovisationen Franz Lehrndorfer

Catholic hymns in German
20th-century hymns in German
Marian hymns
1935 songs